The 1985 Pilkington Glass Championships was a women's tennis tournament played on grass courts at the Devonshire Park Lawn Tennis Club in Eastbourne, United Kingdom and was part of the Category 3 tier of the 1985 WTA Tour. It was the 12th edition of the tournament and ran from 17 June until 22 June 1985. First-seeded Martina Navratilova won the singles title, her fourth consecutive at the event and fifth in total.

Finals

Singles
 Martina Navratilova defeated  Helena Suková 6–4, 6–3
 It was Navratilova's 7th singles title of the year and the 106th of her career.

Doubles
 Martina Navratilova /  Pam Shriver defeated  Kathy Jordan /  Elizabeth Smylie 7–5, 6–4

References

External links
 Official website
 ITF tournament edition details
 Tournament draws

Pilkington Glass Championships
Eastbourne International
Pilkington Glass Championships
Pilkington Glass Championships
1985 in English women's sport